Halcombe is a surname, and may refer to:

 Arthur Halcombe (1834–1900), New Zealand farmer, farm manager and immigration agent
 Edith Halcombe (1844–1903), New Zealand artist, community leader and farmer
 John Halcombe, previously called John Halcomb, (1790–1852), English lawyer and politician
 Ron Halcombe (1906–1993), Australian cricketer